The North American Senior Hurling Championship is a competition run by North American GAA between hurling teams from various cities in the United States and Canada. Most teams come from Boston, Chicago, Philadelphia and San Francisco.

Roll of honour

References
USGAA website
Boston GAA website
Thar an Trasnan

Hurling competitions in the United States